WTVC (channel 9) is a television station in Chattanooga, Tennessee, United States, affiliated with ABC and Fox. The station is owned by Sinclair Broadcast Group, and maintains studios on Benton Drive in Chattanooga; its transmitter is located on Signal Mountain in the town of Walden.

Sinclair also provides some engineering functions for Chattanooga-licensed True Crime Network/Comet affiliate WDSI-TV, channel 61 (owned by New Age Media) and Cleveland-licensed CW/MyNetworkTV/MeTV affiliate WFLI-TV, channel 53 (owned by MPS Media and operated by New Age Media under a local marketing agreement (LMA)) and programs the latter station. WDSI-TV and WFLI-TV maintain separate facilities on East Main Street (SR 8/US 41/US 76) in Chattanooga's Highland Park section; master control and some internal operations for the two stations are based at WTVC's studios.

In addition to its main digital signal, WTVC can be seen off-air on a low-power, Class A repeater, WPDP-CD (channel 25). Licensed to Cleveland and owned by New Age Media, this station has a transmitter on Oswald Dome in unincorporated Polk County (northeast of Benton) in the Cherokee National Forest.

Although parts of the Chattanooga market are in the Central Time Zone, all schedules are listed in Eastern Time.

History

As WROM-TV
The station signed on the air on June 15, 1953 as WROM-TV, an NBC affiliate licensed to Rome, Georgia, with signal coverage that generally favored Chattanooga. It transmitted an analog signal on VHF channel 9 at 98,000 watts from a tower on Horseleg Mountain west of Rome. WROM-TV also had secondary affiliations with CBS, ABC, and the DuMont Television Network. The station lost CBS when WDEF-TV signed on in 1954. WROM-TV then carried NBC, ABC, and DuMont until 1956 when Dumont went off the air and WRGP-TV (now WRCB-TV) signed on and took the NBC affiliation. At that time, ABC opted to end its affiliate relationship with WROM-TV and secure secondary affiliations with WDEF and WRGP because WROM-TV's signal, now reduced to 31,000 watts visual, only reached the south suburbs of Chattanooga.

WROM-TV continued as an independent station until late 1957. During its tenure as a Rome station, it claimed to be "Dixie's Largest Independent." The station ran a late-afternoon and prime-time schedule of old movies, "hillbilly" music performances (which were common on Southern TV stations in the 1950s) and occasionally, ABC TV network fare such as Omnibus.

Martin Theaters had petitioned the FCC for permission to move its also recently purchased WDAK-TV on Channel 28 in Columbus, Georgia to channel 9, but FCC rules mandated a certain amount of separation for stations on the same channel, and Channel 9 in Rome provided a strong grade B signal to Columbus. Additionally, the FCC normally did not allow common ownership of two stations with overlapping signals, and found that the overlap between the Channel 9 in WROM and the proposed Channel 9 in Columbus would have been too great. The move to Chattanooga by WROM-TV would satisfy the co-channel restriction.

The Chattanooga-Columbus channel reallocation was part of the last huge FCC national analog channel reallocation that saw stations in the Southeast switch frequencies not only in Chattanooga and Columbus, but also in Dothan and Montgomery, Alabama; Greenwood, Tupelo, and Laurel, Mississippi; Florence, South Carolina and High Point, North Carolina.

Ironically, Rome lost a second television frequency 40 years later, when WZGA (UHF channel 14, now Ion Television O&O WPXA-TV) moved its operations to Atlanta after several years of operation. However, unlike WROM-TV, channel 14 still has its license in Rome. WROM is still on the air on AM 710. WPXA (now carried on digital channel 31, but still virtually mapped to 14) is still licensed to Rome, while a digital fill-in translator for WSB-TV from Atlanta is licensed to Rome on digital channel 14, but mapped virtually to channel 2.

As WTVC
Channel 9 returned to full-power as ABC affiliate WTVC in Chattanooga on February 11, 1958. It still operates under the original license for WROM-TV. Chattanooga also became one of the smallest television markets in the country to have three VHF stations. WTVC is the only station in Chattanooga to have never had a secondary affiliation with another network.

WTVC developed a strong reputation for local programming in its early years. Among the shows that WTVC pioneered was the children's educational show Funtime with Marcia Kling. Shock Theater which aired on Saturday nights developed a cult following with WTVC Programming Director Tommy Reynolds dressed up as Dracula with the moniker "Doctor Shock" alongside his irreverent sidekick "Dingbat". The Bob Brandy Show which aired in the afternoons featured cartoons and kids activities hosted by WTVC advertising executive Bob Brandy, his wife Ingrid, and their horse Rebel.

In 1969, Martin Theaters was sold to J. B. Fuqua, a businessman from Augusta, Georgia. Fuqua also owned WJBF-TV in Augusta, WTVW in Evansville, Indiana, and KTHI-TV (now KVLY-TV) in Fargo, North Dakota. Over the next few years each station was sold with WTVC being purchased in 1980 by the Belo Corporation of Dallas, Texas. In 1984, Freedom Communications bought the station along with KFDM in Beaumont, marking the newspaper chain's second television acquisition. Belo put WTVC and KFDM on the market after it announced plans to purchase Corinthian Broadcasting from Dun & Bradstreet so that the company could comply with the FCC-mandated ownership limit of five VHF television stations which was in effect at the time.

When WTVC moved its operations to Chattanooga in 1958, it opened a studio at its transmitter on Signal Mountain. In 1966, it moved to new facilities in the Golden Gateway Shopping Center in downtown Chattanooga next to a Zayre department store. Over the years, however, the station outgrew the building. In January 2000, WTVC moved into a new digitally-equipped  studio located adjacent to the Highway 58 / Highway 153 interchange.

After filing Chapter 11 bankruptcy, Freedom announced on November 2, 2011, that it would sell its stations, including WTVC, to Sinclair Broadcast Group. The group deal closed on April 2, 2012.

WTVC-DT2
Following the purchase of non-license assets from Fox affiliate WDSI-TV by Sinclair, its Fox affiliation and programming moved to WTVC's second digital subchannel.

During a transition process that was completed on October 31, 2015, WTVC's second digital channel simulcast WDSI. On that date, when Sinclair launched their new network Comet, the Fox schedule and the intellectual unit for WDSI's main signal moved permanently to WTVC-DT2 under the on-air moniker Fox Chattanooga. The programming on This TV which had been on WTVC-DT2 moved to WDSI's main signal, with Comet launching on WDSI-DT2; the MyNetworkTV subchannel was moved to WFLI-DT2, with the MeTV signal which had been carried on that slot moved to WFLI-DT3. Cable, satellite, and EPB viewers saw no change, as WTVC-DT2 took over the former channel slots for WDSI's main signal.

Programming
WTVC is one of the few ABC affiliates that do not air America This Morning at all. Syndicated programming broadcast on WTVC (as of September 2021) includes Wheel of Fortune, Tamron Hall, The Kelly Clarkson Show, Jeopardy!, Live with Kelly and Ryan, and Dr. Phil.

Syndicated programming broadcast on WTVC-DT2 (as of September 2021) includes The Big Bang Theory, Judge Mathis, Seinfeld, Family Feud, The Dr. Oz Show, Mike & Molly, The Doctors, and Last Man Standing.

Newscasts
As of May 2021, WTVC presently broadcasts 33½ hours of locally produced newscasts each week (with 5½ hours each weekday and three hours each on Saturdays and Sundays). In the event of special sports coverage overlapping news time, the station streams a live newscast on its website. The station also airs a public affairs show, This-N-That, which is operated separately from the news department, but does have news updates when necessary. Longtime personality Don Welch hosted the show until his retirement in 2014. James Howard now hosts the show that airs at 12:30 weekdays, which does has a weather segment.

Through the late-1960s and mid-1970s, WTVC branded its newscasts under the Eyewitness News label. In 1975, this switched to Action News. In the late-1980s, it was one of the first stations in the country to adopt the NewsChannel branding.

In the early 1990s, WTVC produced a 10 p.m. newscast for then-independent WFLI-TV but that was eventually canceled. In 1994, the station began airing a nightly 10 o'clock broadcast on Fox affiliate WDSI-TV using station meteorologists, sports anchors, news reporters and news video, while WDSI provided separate news anchors. In 2000, that station launched its own news department and aired local news on weekday mornings, weekday afternoons at 4, and nightly at 10. In 2004, the news department at WDSI closed down and a news share agreement with WTVC was re-established. Since then, this station has been producing Fox 61 First at 10 on WDSI. With the acquisition of WDSI-TV's non-license assets and Fox programming, the 10 p.m. newscast is now branded First at 10 on Fox Chattanooga.

From the 1960s through the 1970s, WTVC newscasts were usually in last place, but it was not until new owners Belo took over, that the ratings began to favor WTVC. Since the mid-1980s, WTVC had waged a spirited battle with WRCB for first place in the local news ratings weekdays, while WDEF has usually trailed both stations. On March 1, 2014, WTVC launched the area's second-only weekend morning newscast. Named Good Morning Chattanooga Weekend, the broadcasts air from 6:00–7:00 and from 8:00–9:00 a.m. The weekend editions of Good Morning America are aired between the newscasts at 7:00 a.m.

Technical information

Subchannels
The station's digital signal is multiplexed:

On December 16, 2014, WTVC added a 24/7 local weather channel, affiliated with WeatherNation TV on digital channel 9.3. WeatherNation was dropped in favor of TBD Network on June 1, 2017.

Translator

Analog-to-digital conversion
WTVC shut down its analog signal, over VHF channel 9, on June 12, 2009, the official date in which full-power television stations in the United States transitioned from analog to digital broadcasts under federal mandate. The station's digital signal relocated from its pre-transition UHF channel 35 to VHF channel 9 for post-transition operations.

References

External links

ABC network affiliates
TBD (TV network) affiliates
Sinclair Broadcast Group
Television channels and stations established in 1953
TVC
1953 establishments in Georgia (U.S. state)